The Baalbek Stones are six massive Roman worked stone blocks in Baalbek (ancient Heliopolis), Lebanon, characterised by a megalithic gigantism unparallelled in antiquity.

The smallest three are part of a podium wall in the Roman complex of the Temple of Jupiter Baal (Heliopolitan Zeus) on Tel Baalbek and are known as the "Trilithon".

The remaining three are Roman monoliths, not part of a larger structure, conventionally known as the "Stone of the Pregnant Woman" (estimated at 1,000 t), the "Stone of the South" (est. 1,242 t), and the "Forgotten Stone" (est. 1,650 t). These are, in reverse order, the first, third, and tied fifth largest known stones ever quarried in human history. They are believed to have been intended for the nearby Jupiter Baal complex, possibly as an addition to the Trilithon; but, perhaps due to their size, they were never removed from their quarry. They have not been used since their extraction in ancient times.

Numerous archaeological expeditions have gone to the site starting in the 19th century, primarily German and French groups, and research has continued into the 21st century.

Stone of the Pregnant Woman 

The Stone of the Pregnant Woman, also called the First Monolith, still lies in the ancient quarry at a distance of 900 m from the Heliopolis temple complex. Although the smallest of the three monoliths, it is also the most famous due to its fine condition, the imposing angle at which it lies, and its never having been fully hidden by earth.

In 1996, a geodetic team of the Austrian city of Linz conducted topographical measurements at the site which aimed at establishing the exact dimensions of the two monoliths and their possible use in the construction of the gigantic Jupiter temple. According to their calculations, the block weighs 1,000.12 t, thus practically confirming older estimations such as that of Jean-Pierre Adam.

The rectangular stone block is:
 20.31–20.76 m long
 4 m wide at the base
 4.14–5.29 m wide at the top
 4.21–4.32 m high
 Has an estimated density of 2.6–2.8 g/cm3

There are multiple stories behind the name. One says the monolith is named after a pregnant woman who tricked the people of Baalbek into believing that she knew how to move the giant stone if only they would feed her until she gave birth. Others say the name comes from the legends that pregnant jinn were assigned the task of cutting and moving the stone, while others say that the name reflects the belief that a woman who touches the stone experiences an increase in fertility.

Stone of the South 

The Stone of the South, also called the Second Monolith, was rediscovered in the same quarry in the 1990s. With its weight estimated at 1,242 t, it surpasses even the dimension of the Stone of the Pregnant Woman. (There is some confusion over the naming, due to its location having been forgotten, and accordingly some sources identify "Stone of the South" as an alternate name of the Stone of the Pregnant Woman.)

These are dimensions of the rectangular stone block, assuming that its shape is consistent in its still-buried parts:
 19.5–20.5 m long
 4.34–4.56 m wide
 4.5 m high
 Has an estimated density of 2.6–2.8 g/cm3

Forgotten Stone  

The Forgotten Stone, also called the Third Monolith, was discovered in the same quarry in 2014 by archaeologists from the German Archaeological Institute. Its weight is estimated at around 1,650 tonnes, making it the largest stone ever quarried.

It measures:
 19.6 m long
 6 m wide
 at least 5.5 m high (still partly buried)

Trilithon 

The Trilithon, also called the Three Stones, is a group of three horizontally lying giant stones, which form part of the podium of the Temple of Jupiter Baal at Baalbek. The location of the megalithic structures is atop of a hill in the region, known as Tel Baalbek. Each one of these stones is 19 metres long, 4.2 metres high, and 3.6 metres thick, and weighs around 750–800 tonnes. The supporting stone layer beneath features a number of stones which weigh an estimated 350 tonnes and are 11 metres wide.

Although they do not form a trilithon in the modern archaeological sense, they have been known as the Trilithon since at latest the early Byzantine period.

See also 
Western Stone
List of ancient architectural records

References

Bibliography

External links 

Ancient Roman buildings and structures in Lebanon
Roman sites in Lebanon
Monoliths
Tourism in Lebanon
Tourist attractions in Lebanon